The following is a timeline of the history of the city of León, Guanajuato, Mexico.

Prior to 20th century

 1576 - León founded by Spaniards.
 1582 -  (jail) built.
 1767 -  (church) built.
 1792 - Population: 23,711 town; 54,952 parish.
 1836 - León attains city status.
 1856 -  built.
 1863 - Catholic Diocese of León established.
 1866 - Cathedral of León, Guanajuato consecrated.
 1880 - Teatro Doblado (theatre) opens.
 1882 - Population: 70,022 city; 172,432 parish.
 1889 - Flood.
 1895 - Population: 90,978.
 1896 - Heroes' Causeway Arch erected.
 1900 - Population: 62,623.

20th century

 1901 - Teatro del Círculo Leonés Mutualista (theatre) founded.
 1915 - León becomes capital of Guanajuato state.
 1921 -  (church) construction begins.
 1926 - June: Flood.
 1928 - Partido Socialista Leones (labor group) and Unión de Curtidores football club formed.
 1943 - Club León football club formed.
 1945 - Union Civica Leonesa (political group) founded.
 1946
 2 January: Political protest; crackdown.
 El Sol de León newspaper in publication.
 1948 - Archivo Histórico Municipal de León (city archive) inaugurated.
 1950 - Population: 122,585.
 1965 - Boletín del Archivo Municipal de León (history journal) begins publication.
 1967 - Estadio León (stadium) opens.
 1969 - Sister city relationship established with San Diego, USA.
 1972 -  established.
 1978 - Convention Center established.
 1979 - León Zoological Park opens.
 1988 - Carlos Medina Plascencia becomes mayor.
 1990 - Del Bajío International Airport opens near city.
 1991 - Eliseo Pérez Martínez becomes mayor.
 2000 - Cultural Institute of Leon and Teatro María Grever (theatre)  established.

21st century

 2002 -  begins.
 2003
 Optibús transit system begins operating.
 Ricardo Alaníz Posada becomes mayor.
 2004 - Lechugueros de León basketball team formed.
 2005 - Population: 1,278,087 municipality.
 2006
 6 July: 2006 Guanajuato state election held.
  becomes mayor.
 2008 - Museo de Arte e Historia de Guanajuato (museum) opens.
 2009 -  becomes mayor.
 2010
 Teatro del Bicentenario (theatre) opens.
 Population: 1,436,480 municipality.
 2012 - 23 March: Catholic pope visits city.

See also
 León history (es)
 List of mayors of León, Mexico
 Guanajuato history (state)

References

This article incorporates information from the Spanish Wikipedia.

Bibliography

in English
Published in the 19th century
 
 

Published in the 20th century
 
 
 
 
 
 
  (fulltext via OpenLibrary)
  (fulltext via OpenLibrary)

Published in the 21st century

in Spanish
 Luis Manrique, Brevisima relacion historica . .. de la ciudad de Leon (Leon, 1854)
  + via Google Books
 Wigberto Jiménez Moreno, “Ciudad de León,” Enciclopedia de México (Mexico, 1974)

External links

  (includes Leon)

León, Guanajuato
Leon
Leon